The Greece men's under-18 national basketball team (Greece youth U-18 men's national basketball team) is the representative national basketball team of Greece in international men's youth basketball competitions, such as the FIBA Europe Under-18 Championship. It is organized and run by the Hellenic Basketball Federation. They are the reigning European champions in that category as of September 2015 after winning the 2015 European Championship.

FIBA Europe Under-18 Championship

Team

FIBA U18 European Championship 2019 Roster

External links
Hellenic Basketball Federation

Under
Greece
18